The First Methodist Church in Oshkosh, Wisconsin is a historic church at 502 N. Main Street.  It was built as the Wagner Opera House.  The main structure was built in Italianate style 1874-75 but it was renovated extensively to its current Neoclassical appearance in 1924–25.  It was added to the National Register of Historic Places in 1995.

It is a brick building.  It is unusual in Wisconsin as an urban church building with storefronts at street-level. The building was begun as an opera house, until damaged by a fire in 1874. At that point the Methodist congregation bought it and completed it as a Neo-Classical-styled church. After they moved to a new building in 1970, it was used by Boys' Club and as a homeless shelter.

References

Churches completed in 1924
Churches in Winnebago County, Wisconsin
Neoclassical architecture in Wisconsin
Italianate architecture in Wisconsin
Methodist churches in Wisconsin
Churches on the National Register of Historic Places in Wisconsin
National Register of Historic Places in Winnebago County, Wisconsin
1924 establishments in Wisconsin
Italianate church buildings in the United States
Neoclassical church buildings in the United States